Elections to the Swiss Federal Council were held on 15 December 1999 to elect all seven members of Switzerland's Federal Council.  The 246 members of the United Federal Assembly elect the seven members individually by an absolute majority of votes, with the members serving for four years, beginning on 1 January 2000, or until resigning.

Results

Seat held by Adolf Ogi

Seat held by Kaspar Villiger

Seat held by Ruth Dreifuss

Seat held by Moritz Leuenberger

Seat held by Pascal Couchepin

Seat held by Ruth Metzler

Seat held by Joseph Deiss

Footnotes

External links
  Federal Assembly webpage on the 1999 Federal Council election

Federal Council
1999